Tanakal is a village in Sri Sathya Sai district of the Indian state of Andhra Pradesh. It is the headquarters of Tanakal mandal in Kadiri revenue division.

References 

Villages in Sri Sathya Sai district
Mandal headquarters in Sri Sathya Sai district